Josef "Joschi" Pöhs (14 March 1912 – 30 December 1943) was a Luftwaffe ace and recipient of the Knight's Cross of the Iron Cross during World War II. The Knight's Cross of the Iron Cross was awarded to recognise extreme battlefield bravery or successful military leadership. Pöhs was attached with the Jagdgeschwader 54 fighter wing until spring of 1942 when he transferred to Erprobungskommando 16, a test unit for the new Messerschmitt Me 163.  Pöhs was killed on 30 December 1943 when his Messerschmitt Me 163 was damaged on take-off. When the drop away undercarriage bounced off the ground, it hit the underbelly of the aircraft on rebound, damaging a fuel line containing T-Stoff. This caused the engine to shut down and forced Pöhs to try an attempt to glide back to safety. However, he crashed at Bad Zwischenahn succumbing to injuries he sustained due to exposure to T-Stoff. During his career he was credited with 43 aerial victories.

Awards 
 Flugzeugführerabzeichen
 Front Flying Clasp of the Luftwaffe
 Ehrenpokal der Luftwaffe (9 August 1941)
 Iron Cross (1939)
 2nd Class
 1st Class
 Knight's Cross of the Iron Cross on 6 August 1941 as Leutnant of the Reserves and pilot in the 5./Jagdgeschwader 54
 German Cross in Gold on 9 December 1941 as Oberleutnant in the II./Jagdgeschwader 54

References

Citations

Bibliography

 
 
 
 
 
 

1912 births
1943 deaths
People from Schwechat
German World War II flying aces
Recipients of the Gold German Cross
Recipients of the Knight's Cross of the Iron Cross
20th-century Austrian military personnel
Luftwaffe personnel killed in World War II